Marshall Wright is a baseball historian.  Born in LaGrange, Illinois and raised in North Riverside, Illinois, he resides in Quincy, Massachusetts.

Wright graduated from the Bill Kinnamon Umpire School in 1980.  He has been an employee of Howe Sportsdata (now SportsTicker) since 1994.

He has written several books on the history of minor league baseball. In 1998, he received the Sporting News - SABR Baseball Research Award for his book on the International League.

Wright has been a member of the Society for American Baseball Research (SABR) since 1987.

In 1998, Wright and fellow baseball historian Bill Weiss were chosen by minor league baseball to choose The National Baseball Association's top 100 minor league teams.

References

Bibliography
Nineteenth Century Baseball: Year-By-Year Statistics for the Major League Teams, 1871 Through 1900
The American Association: Year-By-Year Statistics for the Baseball Minor League, 1902-1952
The International League: Year-by-year Statistics, 1884-1953
The National Association of Base Ball Players, 1857-1870 .
The Southern Association in Baseball, 1885-1961
The Texas League in Baseball, 1888-1958

External links
Society for American Baseball Research Official Site

American sportswriters
Year of birth missing (living people)
Living people
21st-century American historians
21st-century American male writers
American male non-fiction writers